Calvert Island is an island in Whitefish Bay, Lake of the Woods in Kenora District, Ontario, Canada.

The western edge is lined with smooth rocks that are tilted at a 45-55 degree angle and go straight into the water. Calvert Island is mostly undeveloped, except for Whitefish Bay Camp, which is on the southern tip.

The island has two bays: one named Clipper Bay and one unnamed. The unnamed smaller bay is very shallow, and is usually a breeding ground for frogs and Northern Pike. Most of the cabins of Whitefish Bay Camp overlook this small, shallow bay.

Patsy Island, which is uninhabited, lies immediately to the east of Calvert Island, and there are numerous unnamed surrounding islands.

References

External links
Whitefish Bay Camp Website

Landforms of Kenora District
Lake islands of Ontario